Ake (Aike) is a Plateau language of Nigeria. It is spoken in three villages near Akwanga.

References

Languages of Nigeria
South Plateau languages